Merris Estelle Hillard (born 7 March 1949) is an Australian printmaker and photographer, born in Sydney Australia.

Early life and education 
Merris began her Bachelor of Fine Arts at RMIT University in Melbourne in 1969, majoring in painting. She graduated in 1971 and went on to study printmaking at the Prahran College of Advanced Education in 1972. She graduated with a Diploma of Fine Art (Printmaking) in 1975.

In 1973 she began working in the Pathology Department at the Royal Women's Hospital in Melbourne as a medical artist and photographer. She also taught painting in her own studio and various centres.

Exhibitions 
 Western Pacific Print Biennale: 1977
 Statewide Building Society (solo exhibition): 1984
 Wyreena Gallery: 1987

Prizes 
 Mornington Peninsula Print Prize: 1974, 1975 and 1982.
 Geelong Print Prize :1974
 Portia Geach Memorial Award: 1974
 Minnie Crouch Prize: 1975
 Perth Print Prize: 1977
 Blake Prize: 1981

References 

Living people
1949 births
Australian women artists
Australian printmakers
RMIT University alumni